Kishor Kadam (born 9 November 1967) is an Indian actor and poet who has acted prominently in Marathi and Hindi movies. He has also acted in Tamil movies and has appeared in some television serials as well. He is a veteran Marathi poet, writing with his pseudonym Saumitra and well known for his poems in the album Garawa with Milind Ingle, all songs revolved on the topic of rain.

Career
Kishor won critical acclaim for his performance in the lead role in Samar directed by Shyam Benegal, the film won the National Film Award for the best film in 1999. He also has acted in Natrang as Pandoba. In 2010 he won the Zee Gaurav Puraskar for best supporting actor and the Nilu Phule Sanman award. His other Hindi ventures include Ek Chalis Ki Last Local, Black Friday And the newer films Baby (2015), Dil Pe Mat Le Yaar and Special 26 among others.

More recently, Kishor played terrorist leader Ravindran in the Hindi TV series 24.

Filmography

 Antarnaad  Hindi (1991)
 Mammo  Hindi (1994)
 Limited Maanuski  Marathi (1995)
 Bangarwadi  Marathi (1995)
 Is Raat Ki Subah Nahin  Hindi (1996)
 Samar  Urdu (1999)
 Dil Pe Mat Le Yaar!!  Hindi (2000)
 Black Friday  Hindi (2004)
 Ek Chalis Ki Last Local (2007)  Hindi
 Ek Cup Chya (2009)  Marathi
 Pratisaad - The Response (2010)  Marathi
 Natarang (2010)  Marathi
 Jogwa (2010)  Marathi
 Pangira (2010)  Marathi
 Deool (2011)  Marathi
 Balak-Palak (2013)  Marathi
 Vanshvel (2013)  Marathi
 Special 26 (2013)  Hindi
 Pikul (2014)  Marathi
Nati (2014)  Marathi
 Gandhi Of The Month (2014)  English
 Fandry (2014)  Marathi
 Manjunath (2014)  Hindi
 Highway (2015)  Marathi
 Partu (2015)  Marathi
 Ganvesh (2015)  Marathi
 Janiva (2015)  Marathi
 Anna (2016)  Hindi
 Idak: The Goat (2017)  Marathi
 Theeran Adhigaaram Ondru (2017)  Tamil
 Wagherya (2018)  Marathi
 Section 375 (2019)  Hindi
 Albert Pinto Ko Gussa Kyun Aata Hai? (2019)  Hindi
 Chatrapati Shasan (2019)  Marathi
 Dithee (2019)  Marathi
 Jhund (2022)  Hindi

 Operation Romeo (2022) Hindi Patil Remake of Malayalam film Ishq : Not A Love Story

Television

References

External links 
 

21st-century Indian male actors
Indian male television actors
Male actors in Marathi cinema
Male actors in Hindi cinema
Living people
Place of birth missing (living people)
Marathi people
Marathi-language poets
1967 births
Male actors in Marathi television